Matthew James Norman (born 17 September 1986) is an Australian man who was convicted in Indonesia for drug trafficking as a member of the Bali Nine. In 2005, Norman was arrested in a room at the Melasti Hotel in Kuta together with three others. Police uncovered  of heroin in a suitcase in the room. After a criminal trial, on 15 February 2006 Norman was sentenced to life imprisonment. His appeal to the Indonesian Supreme Court to have the sentence reduced suffered a shock when the Supreme Court imposed the death penalty on 6 September 2006. A subsequent appeal to the Indonesian Supreme Court, following a full confession by Norman to his role in the plan to import heroin from Bali to Australia, resulted in the original sentence of life imprisonment being reinstated.

Alleged trafficking conspiracy
From Quakers Hill in Sydney's western suburbs, Norman was employed at Eurest, a catering company, where he met colleagues Martin Stephens, Renae Lawrence, and his supervisor, Andrew Chan. All four would later be convicted of drug trafficking as fellow members of the Bali Nine.

Media reports based on the testimony of co-conspirator, Renae Lawrence, claim that Norman was involved in an attempt in December 2004, at trafficking from Indonesia to Australia. This attempt was allegedly organised by Tan Duc Thanh Nguyen and involved Norman, Lawrence, Andrew Chan, and others. The delivery was aborted when heroin suppliers failed to deliver "due to a financial matter or someone knowing about the plan the shipment was cancelled".

On or about 8 April 2005, Norman arrived in Bali with Si Yi Chen and checked into the White Rose Hotel. It was reported that Norman and Chen "hardly ever left their room".

On 14 April, Norman, Chen, Lawrence and Stephens checked into Adhi Dharma hotel, with Nguyen arriving in the same hotel two days later. It was reported the police took the room next to Norman and Chen. In the evening of Sunday 17 April, appearing like tourists, Norman, Nguyen, and Chen checked into the Melasti Hotel. Myuran Sukumaran, who was also with them, with his bags, left them with the others as he decided to go to the Hard Rock Hotel complex.

Arrest in Indonesia
Approximately 20 minutes after checking in, Norman, aged 18, was arrested at the Melasti Hotel in Kuta on 17 April 2005 with Tan Duc Thanh Nguyen, Myuran Sukumaran and Si Yi Chen.

Earlier that day at Ngurah Rai International Airport in Denpasar, Indonesian police also arrested the following drug mules after they were found carrying various amounts of heroin concealed on their bodies. Martin Stephens was found to be carrying ; Renae Lawrence was found to be carrying ; Michael Czugaj was found to be carrying  and Scott Rush was found to be carrying  of heroin. Alleged co-ringleader, Andrew Chan was also arrested the same day whilst seated on an Australian Airlines flight waiting to depart Denpasar for Sydney. At the time Chan was arrested, he was carrying three mobile phones and a boarding pass. No drugs were found in his possession.

Of the nine arrested, Norman was the youngest.

Criticism of Australian Federal Police tipoff

Lee Rush, the father of Scott Rush, a fellow member of the Bali Nine, said that he contacted the Australian Federal Police (AFP) prior to the commission of the offence, fearing his son was travelling to Bali and would commit a drug-related crime. Rush senior claims then to have received assurances from the AFP that they would tell his son he was under surveillance to dissuade him from going through with the crime before the group's departure from Indonesia. Scott Rush's lawyers said he was never contacted. It was revealed that the AFP alerted Indonesian police that a crime was to be committed approximately two weeks before the arrests, and had commenced an investigation about ten weeks prior to the arrests. When the Bali Nine were arrested, the news of the tipoff became public and there was criticism of the role of the AFP in protecting the interests of Australian citizens. Commenting on the matter at the time, AFP Commissioner Mick Keelty was reported as saying:

Rush took action in the Federal Court of Australia against the AFP for breach of the bilateral treaty between Indonesia and Australia when information was handed by the AFP to the Indonesians. Rush's case claimed that such information should only be released by the Attorney-General. However, the Commonwealth Government maintained that the treaty only applies after a suspect is charged. The application was dismissed by the Federal Court in January 2006.

Criminal trial
Criminal trials for the accused commenced in the Denpasar District Court on 11 October 2005. Chen, Nguyen, and Norman, all arrested at the Melasti Hotel and earning the numeric epithet, The Melasti Three, were tried together, with the remaining six defendants tried separately.

In December 2005, it was reported that tensions were building between the Bali Nine drug mules and Sukumaran and Chan. Several days later, lawyers acting for some members of the Bali Nine initially sought the support of the Director of Public Prosecutions to intervene and lay charges for conspiracy to import drugs, so that the nine could be extradited and charged under Australian law. However, the judges hearing the trial matters in Bali called for Australia not to intervene in Indonesia's right to impose capital punishment;. Lawyers acting for Stephens, one of the Bali Nine, claimed that the fairness of his trial was in jeopardy following comments made in the media by Indonesian Foreign Minister Hassan Wirajuda that Australians should be prepared for members of the Bali Nine to receive a death sentence, if found guilty.

Sentencing and appeal

During his final plea to judges, Norman said: 

Norman's mother, Robyn Norman, said after sentencing a life sentence was a better result than the death penalty, and also thanked the Indonesian government for looking after her son:

On 15 February 2006, Norman was sentenced to life imprisonment. Commenting on the sentences at the time, Australian Federal Police Commissioner Keelty stated:

Australian Prime Minister at that time, John Howard was reported as commenting:
 and 

Appealing against the sentence, on 6 September 2006, his sentence was upgraded to the death penalty. On 5 March 2008, three judges in the Indonesian Supreme Court in Jakarta decided to spare the lives of Chen, Norman and Nguyen.

Criminal charges pending in Australia
In an earlier unrelated incident, Norman and Lawrence were arrested on 26 March 2005, travelling along the Pacific Highway in a stolen vehicle. It was reported that police were required to use road spikes to intercept the vehicle. Both were due to appear on 26 April 2005 in the Gosford Magistrates Court to face car theft and traffic related charges. However, due to their arrest in Indonesia nine days earlier, both Norman and Lawrence failed to appear.

See also
List of Australians in international prisons
List of Australian criminals

References

Australian drug traffickers
Living people
Criminals from Sydney
1986 births
21st-century Australian criminals
Australian people imprisoned abroad
Australian prisoners sentenced to death
Australian prisoners sentenced to life imprisonment
Prisoners sentenced to death by Indonesia
Prisoners sentenced to life imprisonment by Indonesia
Place of birth missing (living people)
Inmates of Kerobokan Prison